The Evanion Collection is a collection of printed Victorian ephemera in the British Library created by the conjurer, ventriloquist and humorist Henry Evans who used the stage name 'Evanion'.

Contents
The collection of around 5,000 items was purchased by the British Museum Library in 1895 and includes:
Posters recording popular Victorian entertainments in Music Halls, Palaces of Variety, Theatres, and Circuses. These include performers such as Marie Lloyd, Dan Leno, Maskelyne and Cooke, and Evanion himself.
Advertisements and price lists for clothes, food, medicines, household items and domestic goods, together with Trade catalogues and cards which illustrate everyday life in Victorian England in the second half of the nineteenth century.
Tickets for theatrical performances, race meetings, lectures and exhibitions.

Harry Houdini described seeing the collection for the first time as follows:

Many items from the original collection relating to magic were acquired by Houdini and are now owned by the Harry Ransom Humanities Research Center at the University of Texas at Austin.

References

Further reading
"The Evanion Collection" by E. Harland in The British Library Journal Vol. 13, No. 1 (Spring 1987), pp. 64-70.

Sample items from the collection
Advertisement for teas by Cooper, Cooper and Co., 1887.
Poster for Maskelyne and Cooke's Marvellous Entertainment at the Egyptian Hall, London, 1887.
Seed catalogue by Webb and Sons, the Queen's Seedsmen, 1885.

External links

British Library Evanion Collection search page.
British Library Evanion Collection Online
Evanion at illusionwiki.com.

British Library collections
Magic museums
Victorian era